Albert Russell Nichols (1859–1933 ) was an English museum curator and zoologist who worked mainly in Ireland.

Nichols was educated at Clare College, Cambridge, graduating B.A. in mathematics as 16th wrangler in 1882. Nichols came from England to Dublin in 1883 as Assistant in the Museum of Science and Art (now the National Museum of Ireland). He worked on zoology, classifying and arranging the invertebrates throughout his forty-one years of service. He eventually became Keeper of the Natural History Division. Nichols took part in the Lord Bandon dredging expedition of 1886 with Haddon, sponsored by the Royal Irish Academy, and in the biological surveys of Lambay, Clare Island and Malahide.

He compiled or revised lists of echinoderms, marine Mollusca and birds of Ireland, issued by the Museum or by the Royal Irish Academy.

References

1859 births
1933 deaths
English curators
Irish zoologists
Alumni of Clare College, Cambridge